The Ministry of Health is a government ministry which organize public health affairs within the Indonesian government.

History 
Ministry of Health was formed on 19 August 1945. The ministry is responsible for public health affairs in Indonesia. The ministry is led by a minister who is responsible to the president and part of the cabinet. Commonly, the minister usually came from medical doctor, however some of them were military doctor. Since 2009, the government has been required to allocate 5% of state budget for health sector. However, the mandatory 5% state budget for health sector was achieved in 2019.

In 2001, the ministry was merged with Department of Social Affairs into Department of Health and Social Welfare, however the merger was short-lived and both departments were reestablished. On 27 November 2001, Board for Development and Empowerment of Human Resources for Health was established.

On 23 September 2021, National Institute of Health Research and Development (NIHRD) will be transformed into Agency for Health Policies Development, a regulatory agency intended to provide only policies and standards making for state health activity, no longer doing research as the research part will be relinquished to National Research and Innovation Agency. Thus, on 7 November 2021, the Ministry issued order to NIHRD and its child agencies to halt their activities per 31 December 2021 as unit under auspices of Ministry of Health, effectively started the dismantlement of Balitbangkes. In the order, NIHRD will split into three parts: one part (which is the most) relinquished to BRIN, one part to become BKPK, and the rest of the Balitbangkes part in regional level will be relinquished to local government where the NIHRD branch formerly existed for being transformed into local-government run public health laboratories for being integrated as part of state public health laboratories system.

List of ministers of health 
 Boentaran Martoatmodjo (1945)
 Darma Setiawan (1945–1947)
 Johannes Leimena (1947–1949), (1950–1953) & (1955–1956)
 Surono (1949)
 Sutopo (1950)
 Ferdinand Lumbantobing (1953)
 Lie Kiat Teng (1953–1955)
 Handrianus S (1956–1957)
 Abdul Azis Saleh (1957–1959)
 Satrio (1959–1966)
 G.A. Siwabessy (1966–1978)
 Soewardjono Soerjaningrat (1978–1983)
 Adhyatma (1988–1993)
 Sujudi (1993–1998)
 Farid Anfasa Moeloek (1998–1999)
 Achmad Sujudi (1999–2004)
 Siti Fadilah Supari (2004–2009)
 Endang Rahayu Sedyaningsih (2009–2012)
 Nafsiah Mboi (2012–2014)
 Nila Moeloek (2014–2019)
 Terawan Agus Putranto (2019–2020)
 Budi Gunadi Sadikin (2020–present)

Organisation 
The ministry structure consist of:

 Office of the Deputy Minister of Health
 Secretariat General 
 Bureau of Planning and Budgeting
 Bureau of Finance and State Assets
 Bureau of Law
 Bureau of Organisation and Human Resources
 Bureau of Communication and Public Services
 Bureau of Goods and Services Procurement
 Bureau of General Affairs 
 Directorate General of Public Health
 Secretariat of Directorate General
 Directorate of Health Promotion and People Empowerment
 Directorate of Nutrition and Mother and Child Health
 Directorate of Productive and Elderly Health
 Directorate of Mental Health
 Directorate of Public Health Governance
 Directorate General of Disease Prevention and Control
 Secretariat of Directorate General
 Directorate of Non-Communicable Disease Prevention and Control
 Directorate of Communicable Disease Prevention and Control
 Directorate of Immunization Management
 Directorate of Health Surveillance and Quarantine
 Directorate of Environmental Health
 Directorate General of Health Service
 Secretariat of Directorate General
 Directorate of Referral Health Care
 Directorate of Primary Health Care
 Directorate of Health Care Governance
 Directorate of Health Care Facilities
 Directorate of Health Care Quality
 Directorate General of Pharmaceutical and Medical Devices
 Secretariat of Directorate General
 Directorate of Pharmaceutical and Medical Devices Resilience
 Directorate of Pharmaceutical Production and Distribution
 Directorate of Pharmaceutical Management and Service
 Directorate of Medical Device Production and Distribution
 Directorate of Medical Device Supervision
 Directorate General of Health Workers
 Secretariat of Directorate General
 Directorate of Health Worker Planning
 Directorate of Health Worker Supply
 Directorate of Health Worker Utilization
 Directorate of Health Worker Quality Improvement
 Directorate of Health Worker Supervision and Guidance
 Inspectorate General
 Agency for Health Policies Development
 Secretariat
 Center of Health Provision Policy
 Center of Health System Resilience and Health Human Resource
 Center of Health Financing and Decentralisation
 Center of Global Health and Health Technology Policy 
 Special Advisor on Health Economics
 Special Advisor on Health Technology
 Special Advisor on Health Law
 Special Advisor on Health Politics and Globalization
 Center of Data and Information Technology
 Center of Health System and Strategy
 Center of Health Crisis
 Center of Hajj Health
 Center of Ministry Civil Service Competence Development

The ministry also coordinate two non-ministry government bodies, those are National Agency of Drug and Food Control and National Population and Family Planning Board.

Literature

References 

Health
Indonesia
Ministries established in 1945